Charis Yulianto (born 11 July 1978) is an Indonesian retired footballer. He normally plays as a central defender. He formerly played for the Indonesia national football team and last played for Arema Indonesia (ISL).

International career
His debut in the senior national team squad was in a World Cup qualifying match against Saudi Arabia on 12 October 2004. Indonesia lost the match 1–3.

International goals

|}

Major international tournaments 
2004 Tiger Cup
2007 AFC Asian Cup 
2008 AFF Suzuki Cup

Honours

Club
Sriwijaya
 Liga Indonesia: 2007–08
 Piala Indonesia: 2008–09, 2010

International
 AFF Championship: Runner-up 2004

Family background 
Charis was born to Supaman and Sutini. He is the youngest of their 9 children.

References

External links

Indonesian footballers
2007 AFC Asian Cup players
1981 births
Living people
People from Blitar
Sportspeople from East Java
Liga 1 (Indonesia) players
Arema F.C. players
PSM Makassar players
Persija Jakarta players
Persib Bandung players
Persela Lamongan players
Sriwijaya F.C. players
Indonesia international footballers
Association football central defenders